Laurence George Luckinbill (born November 21, 1934) is an American actor, playwright and director. He has worked in television, film, and theatre, doing triple duty in the theatre by writing, directing, and starring in stage productions. He is known for penning and starring in one-man shows based upon the lives of United States President Theodore Roosevelt, author Ernest Hemingway, and famous American defense attorney Clarence Darrow; starring in a one-man show based upon the life of US President Lyndon Baines Johnson; and for his portrayal of Spock's half-brother Sybok in the film Star Trek V: The Final Frontier.

Personal life
Luckinbill was born in Fort Smith, Arkansas, the son of Agnes (née Nulph) and Laurence Benedict Luckinbill. He is the uncle of film directors Lana and Lilly Wachowski, the children of his sister, Lynne. He is Roman Catholic.

He attended Fort Smith Junior College from 1951 to 1952, received a Bachelor of Arts degree from the University of Arkansas in 1956, received a Master of Fine Arts degree from the Catholic University of America in 1958, attended New York University in 1980, and studied acting at HB Studio in New York City.

He is married to actress Lucie Arnaz, daughter of Lucille Ball and Desi Arnaz. They have three children together: Simon, Joseph, and Katharine. Arnaz and Luckinbill have toured together in theatrical productions such as They're Playing Our Song. He also has two sons from his previous marriage to actress Robin Strasser, Nicholas and Benjamin.

Career
On television, he started out with roles on the now-defunct American soap operas Where the Heart Is and The Secret Storm. He starred as espionage agent Glenn Garth Gregory in the 1972–1973 ABC dramatic television series, The Delphi Bureau. He has performed in numerous episodes of television series, including Law & Order, Barnaby Jones, Columbo (episode "Make Me a Perfect Murder"), The Mary Tyler Moore Show, and Murder, She Wrote. He also played Lillian Hellman's lawyer Joseph L. Rauh in the television film Dash and Lilly (1999).

His 1961 Broadway debut was in A Man for All Seasons. He starred in Pavel Kohout's 1976 Broadway play Poor Murderer at the Ethel Barrymore Theatre, Michael Cristofer's The Shadow Box (1977) at the Morosco Theater, for which he received a nomination for the Best Featured Actor in a Play, and in Thomas Babe's A Prayer for My Daughter (1978) at the Public Theater. His theatre career has included writing and directing. Luckinbill has written and performed in several one-man shows, including, Hemingway, Teddy, and An Evening with Clarence Darrow. He has also starred in numerous productions of Lyndon, which he did not write. One production was at the LBJ Museum in Austin, Texas, where Lady Bird Johnson was among attendees.

He appeared in the drama film The Boys in the Band (1970), reprising the role of Hank, which he originated on stage. He portrayed Spock's half-brother Sybok in Star Trek V: The Final Frontier (1989). Sean Connery was originally contacted to star in the role but was busy with Indiana Jones and the Last Crusade. William Shatner discovered Luckinbill by chance by channel-surfing late one night and seeing him perform as Johnson. When Shatner called to offer him the role, Luckinbill accepted immediately.

Other film appearances include Such Good Friends (1971), The Promise (1979), and Cocktail (1988). He also narrated the documentary Moonwalk One.

Filmography

References

External links
 
 
 
 
 

1934 births
Living people
20th-century American male actors
21st-century American male actors
American male film actors
American male stage actors
American male television actors
Catholics from Arkansas
Catholic University of America alumni
Male actors from Arkansas
New York University alumni
People from Fort Smith, Arkansas
University of Arkansas alumni
University of Arkansas–Fort Smith alumni